Gagandeep Singh (born 2 November 1985) is an Indian footballer who plays as a defender for Mohammedan S.C.

Career

Air India
Mr.Singh made his debut for Air India F.C. on 20 September 2012 during a Federation Cup match against Mohammedan at the Kanchenjunga Stadium in Siliguri, West Bengal in which he started the match; Air India lost the match 0–1.

Mohammedan
Singh made his debut for Mohammedan in the I-League on 21 September 2013 against Pune F.C. at the Salt Lake Stadium and played the whole match; as Mohammedan lost the match 1–3.

Career statistics

Club
Statistics accurate as of 27 October 2013

References

Indian footballers
1985 births
Living people
I-League players
Salgaocar FC players
Air India FC players
Mohammedan SC (Kolkata) players
Association football defenders
ARA FC players